Första dagen på resten av mitt liv (English: "First day of the rest of my life") is a 2011 studio album by Swedish singer Kikki Danielsson. Although Danielson continued recording studio albums with Roosarna during the 1990s, the album was the first released in her own name since 1993.

The album peaked at number three on the Swedish Albums Chart during the first week of its release. In May 2011, the song "Wagon Wheels" received a Svensktoppen test, but failed to chart.

Track listing

Musicians

Kikki Danielsson – vocals
Mats Persson – drums (1, 11), background singing  (1, 11), percussion (1, 11)
Per Björling – bass (1), background singing  (1, 11)
Peder af Ugglas – Electric guitar (1, 11), munspel (1), background singing  (1) slide guitar (11)
Mats Ronander – Electric guitar (1, 11), munspel (1, 11), background singing  (1)
Sulo – Guitar (1, 2, 3, 7, 14), vocals (6)
Pär Engman – Mandolin (1, 2, 5, 7, 11), background singing  (1, 2, 3, 4, 5, 6, 7, 9, 10, 11, 12), guitar (3, 4, 10, 11, 12), electric guitar (4), banjo (7)
Nico Röhlke – Mandolin (6)
Mats Gunnarsson – Saxophone (1, 5, 8, 9, 12), clarinet (10)
Magnus Jonsson – Trumpet (1, 5, 9, 12), flugelhorn (10)
Ulrika Beijer – background singing  (1, 3, 6, 7, 8, 9, 11, 12), guitar (3, 5)
Johan Dereborn – background singing  (1, 2, 3, 4, 6, 8, 9, 11, 12), bass (2, 4, 8, 9), electric guitar (3, 4, 5, 8), background singing  (9, 11)
Henrik Widén – keyboard (1, 3, 4, 5, 6, 7, 8, 9, 10, 11, 12, 14), percussion (1, 2, 3, 4, 5, 6, 7, 8, 9, 10, 11, 12, 14), drums (2), accordion (2, 8, 14), background singing  (3, 8)
Magnus Eriksson – drums (2, 3, 14)
Fredrik Fagerlund – Electric guitar (2, 3, 6, 14)
Anders Lundström – Dobro (2, 3), background singing  (6, 14), accordion (6)
Peppe Lindholm – drums (4, 9, 12)
Lars Karlsson – Guitar (4, 5, 7, 8), electric guitar (8, 9, 12)
Petter Diamant – drums (5, 7, 8)
Rasmus Diamant – bass (5)
Robert Damberg – violin (5)
Johannes Nordell – drums (6), bass (7), electric guitar (7), background singing  (7)
Martin Tronsson – bass (6, 14)
Per Persson – vocals (9)
Pelle Karlsson – bass (12), electric guitar (12)
Mia Bendes – background singing  (14)

Others
 Producer - Henrik Widén
 Sound engineer - Johan Dereborn
 Mixing - Henrik Widén & Johan Dereborn
 Mastering - Mats Lindfors
 Photo - Emma Svensson
  Cover - Zion Graphics
 Production coordinator - Lasse Höglund

Charts

References 

2011 albums
Kikki Danielsson albums